The Call of the Wild is a 1903 novel by Jack London.

Call of the Wild may also refer to:

Film and television

Adaptations of London's novel
 The Call of the Wild (1923 film), an American film by Hal Roach starring Jack Mulhall
 Call of the Wild (1935 film), an American film starring Clark Gable and Loretta Young
 The Call of the Wild (1972 film), a British film starring Charlton Heston
 The Call of the Wild (1976 film), an American TV film with a screenplay by James Dickey
 Call of the Wild (1993), an American TV film starring Rick Schroder
 The Call of the Wild: Dog of the Yukon (1997), a Canadian TV film starring Rutger Hauer
 Call of the Wild (TV series), a 2000 adventure series on Animal Planet, that is later condensed into a feature-length film
 Call of the Wild (2009 film), an American film starring Christopher Lloyd
 The Call of the Wild (2020 film), an American film starring Harrison Ford

Other films
 The Call of the Wild (1908 film), an American short film directed by D.W. Griffith
 The Call of the Wild  (2007 film), a documentary by Ron Lamothe about the American wanderer Christopher McCandless

Television
 "Call of the Wild" (Due South), a two-part episode of Due South
 "Call of the Wild" (The Cosby Show), an episode of The Cosby Show

Music

Albums 
 Call of the Wild (Powerwolf album), 2021
 Call of the Wild (Lee Aaron album), 1985
 Call of the Wild (Wild Willy Barrett album), 1979
 Call of the Wild (D-A-D album), 1986
 Call of the Wild (Frankie Laine album), 1962
 Call of the Wild (Ted Nugent and the Amboy Dukes album), or the title song
 Call of the Wild (Aaron Tippin album), or the title song
 Call of the Wild, an album by Ellen Shipley and its title song

Songs 
 "Call of the Wild" (song), a 1987 song by Deep Purple
 "Call of the Wild", by Black Sabbath from Headless Cross
 "Call of the Wild", by Chris LeDoux from Whatcha Gonna Do with a Cowboy
 "Call of the Wild", by Die Toten Hosen from Unsterblich
 "Call of the Wild", by Heart from Brigade
 "Call of the Wild", by Heltah Skeltah from Magnum Force
 "Call of the Wild", by Jimi Tenor, covered by GusGus from Attention
 "Call of the Wild", a 1979 single from Lindisfarne
 "Call of the Wild", a 1985 single by Midge Ure
 "Call of the Wild", by Peter Frampton from Premonition
 "Call of the Wild", by Pitbull from Pitbull Starring in Rebelution
 "Call of the Wild", by Roxette from Pearls of Passion
 "Call of the Wild", by Saxon from Innocence Is No Excuse
 "Call of the Wild", by the Tom Tom Club from Boom Boom Chi Boom Boom
 "The Call of the Wild" (song), a 1993 song by artist Aaron Tippin
 "The Call of the Wild", by Alan Parsons from The Time Machine (Alan Parsons album)
 "The Call of the Wild", by David Byrne from Rei Momo
 "Call of the Wild", by Viagra Boys from the 2017 EP of the same name

Other uses in arts, entertainment, and media
 Call of the Wild, a radio program hosted by Monstercat
 "The Call of the Wild", a poem by Robert W. Service
 theHunter: Call of the Wild, a 2017 videogame by Avalanche Studios Group